Tae-ho Kwon (born 7 January 1971) is a Korean taekwondo practitioner. He competed in the men's finweight at the 1988 Summer Olympics.

Biography
Born in Korea, Kwon decided to study taekwondo at a young age after being impressed by older taekwondo students walking in their doboks on the street. He later attended junior high and high school on a sports scholarship. He competed in several international taekwondo competitions including Asian Championships, World Championships, and the 1988 Olympic Games. 
In the 90's, Kwon immigrated to the United States and settled in Southern California where he lives with his family and he currently runs a taekwondo studio.

Career highlights
1992 Asian Championships: GOLD
1991 World Cup: GOLD
1989 World Championships: GOLD
1988 Pre Olympic Games: GOLD
1988 Asian Championships: GOLD

References

External links
 

1971 births
Place of birth unknown
South Korean male taekwondo practitioners
Olympic taekwondo practitioners of South Korea
Taekwondo practitioners at the 1988 Summer Olympics
Living people
20th-century South Korean people